Bethlehem College was an Independent Roman Catholic comprehensive single-sex secondary day school for girls, located in Bland Street, Ashfield, the Inner West of Sydney, New South Wales, Australia. The college was founded in 1881 by the Sisters of Charity.

On 8 June 2022, it was announced that the college would amalgamate with adjacent boys' high school, De La Salle College, and St Vincent’s Primary School, due to increasing demand for co-educational schools in inner Sydney. From 2023, the new school was known as St Vincent's College and from 2027, after a five year transition period, it will become a fully K-12 co-educational school precinct.

Students are easily identifiable by the amethyst and navy school uniform—fondly known around the inner western suburbs of Sydney as "Ribena Berries". The Sisters of Charity ran the college until 1991, when it became a systemic Catholic School run by the Catholic Education Office of the Archdiocese of Sydney.

History under the Sisters of Charity
Prior to 1953 Bethlehem catered for girls from Kindergarten through to the Leaving Certificate in Year 11. In 1953 the Junior (or Primary) School amalgamated with the Parish St. Vincent's Primary which was also run by the Sisters of Charity but which also catered for boys from Kindergarten to Year 2 (3rd grade). The boys then moved on to many other Catholic schools with the majority proceeding to De La Salle College Ashfield, located adjacent to Bethlehem.

Bethlehem College was known for many many years as Bethlehem Ladies College; the nuns of the Sisters of Charity placing great emphasis on ladylike behaviour & dress both in school as well as to and from school.  School rules included wearing of hats and gloves outside school; no eating or drinking in the street; and definitely no talking to boys on the way to and from school.  School rules which were strictly enforced by the Prefects.

Class sizes, at least until 1962, ranged from 80 children in kindergarten to Year 2, 60 girls from Year 3 to Year 6 and 50–60 girls in Years 7, 8 and 9 with quite small classes in Years 10 & 11 because society expected most girls to leave at the end of Year 9 (Intermediate Certificate) only the exceptional Academic Stream girls continued to Year 11 (Leaving Certificate) and then to teaching, nursing or rarely other university courses.

Education streams:
The high school catered to students in two streams; the academic or science stream which offered choices from Physics, Chemistry, Geography, Mathematics I and II, Latin and French.  Students could choose the business stream offering General Mathematics, Bookkeeping, Dress Making as well as the standard Religion, English and History.

Extras were offered in elocution and music.

Sports:
The Combined Sisters of Charity Schools encouraged sports by an Annual Sports Carnival mostly at Leichhardt Oval and Annual Swimming Carnivals for each individual school (Enfield Swimming Pool for Bethlehem students until the Ashfield pool was built in the mid 1960s).  Bethlehem coveted the Annual School Marching prize and drilled the girls accordingly.  Bethlehem's greatest rival was St. Mary's Cathedral who Bethlehem felt had an unwarranted advantage in that the Carnival marching band was from the Cathedral boys school which often played for St. Mary's.

Girls were aligned in ranks of 5 from the tallest at the front to the smallest at the back. Each girl's dress was measured by the Sisters with mother's often having to adjust the length of the dress until it measured exactly 16 inches from the ground.

Marching practice was often held daily when the girls considered it an excellent change for to be allowed to march to a nearby park for practice accompanied by the De La Salle marching band.  "Normal" practice consisted of marching continuously around the playground to the strains of the loudspeaker blaring "A Life on the Ocean Wave", song of the Royal Marines and US Naval Academy.

The school had a basketball team and offered tennis as an elective.  Entrants in the swimming and foot races were by student choice and no practice was offered.

Recreation:
Until at least 1962 the College held regular dance lessons for the students from Kindergarten upwards often with a ball at Ashfield Town Hall or latterly at the College for the Senior Bethlehem girls and the De La Salle boys.  Dancing was then Ballroom Dancing only. The Kindergarten children each learned the same dance year on year; having been paired they learned to recite the steps and perform them at the annual ball where the girl's dressed in white "communion dresses" and the boys dressed in white shirts, black ties and, no doubt, school trousers.

Swimming was a regular weekly event in the summer months when we would take over Enfield pool for the afternoon.  We all enjoyed these relaxing afternoons which culminated in the Annual Swimming Carnival.

Subjects offered:
Students in year 7 to 8 are taught English, Maths, Learning to Learn, PDHPE, Religion and Science. Students will alternate between Visual Arts, Textiles, Geography and History on a semester basis. In year 8, students will be able to choose between Italian or Japanese.

From year 9 to 10 students will be able to choose two electives from the following: Visual Arts, Textiles, Commerce, Sports, Technology, Italian, Japanese, elective History, elective geography (should enough classes be available). During this time students are encouraged to and given the opportunity to complete TAFE certificates from nursing to barista courses.

Bethlehem teaches the following subjects for the HSC should there be enough students to form a class. The minimum amount required is typically 9, should students find themselves interested in a course with limited numbers then students are able to pool with students at De La Salle or attempt long-distance ed.

English
English Advanced
English Extension 1
English Extension 2
Mathematics
Mathematics Extension 1
Mathematics Extension 2
Science
Biology
Chemistry
Physics
Drama
Economics
Society and Culture
Business studies
Community and Family Studies
Dance
Food Technology
History
Ancient History
Modern History
History Extension
Languages Other Than English (LOTE)
Italian
Japanese
Legal Studies
Music 1
Visual Arts
SOR 1
 The class of 2020 is trialling SOR2 again after several years without the course

Grounds 
In 2017 Bethlehem received a government grant to update their outdated and overrun grounds. The Aikenhead building has existed since 1881 as the boarding for the nuns. Construction completed in late 2019.

Notable alumnae 
Monica Attard – award-winning journalist, ABC News and current affairs journalist, presenter of Media Watch; awarded an Order of Australia for excellence in journalism
Geraldine Brooks – author and journalist; Pulitzer Prize winner for her novel March, author of Year of Wonders and many other books, previously political correspondent for the Wall Street Journal in Bosnia, Somalia and the Middle East
Angela D'Amore – Australian politician; elected as a member of the New South Wales Legislative Assembly, Member for Drummoyne
 Barbara Perry – Member of the Legislative Assembly, Member for Auburn, Minister for Western Sydney, Minister for Juvenile Justice, Minister for Assisting the Premier on Citizenship
 Marcia Ralston – actress
 Debbie Spillane – sports journalist and broadcaster
 Deirdre O'Connor - Australian Federal Court judge

See also 

 List of Catholic schools in New South Wales
 Catholic education in Australia

References

External links 
 Bethlehem College website
 Bethlehem College newsletter
 Former Bethlehem College website

Educational institutions established in 1881
Catholic secondary schools in Sydney
Girls' schools in New South Wales
1881 establishments in Australia
Inner West
Alliance of Girls' Schools Australasia